was a Japanese TV cameraman and journalist, who worked for the Australian Broadcasting Corporation in Tokyo in the 1990s, and who reported for Reuters television for more than 15 years. Muramoto was based in Reuters' Tokyo bureau.

Muramoto was the first reporter killed during the 2010 Thai street protests. Photojournalist Fabio Polenghi died in another demonstration on May 19, 2010.

Career
A graduate of Temple University (Japan Campus), Muramoto worked at NBC and then ABC. He joined Reuters as a freelance cameraman in 1992 and became full-time in 1995. During his time with Reuters, he traveled to high-risk areas North Korea and the Philippines (during political instability). He also covered human-interest stories such as Tokyo monkey-waiters and the man who married a character from a video game.

Also active in charity projects, Muramoto walked 100 km in two days in the areas around Mount Fuji to raise money for impoverished communities in Africa. His plan was to attend this walk for a third time starting April 22.

Death
Muramoto was shot and killed on April 10, 2010, while covering violent clashes during the 2010 Thai political protests between Thai troops and anti-government protesters. Muramoto was filming clashes between protests and government forces on Rajdamnoen Road in Bangkok. Muramoto was shot in the chest during the clash. The bullet exited his back, though doctors could not tell what type of bullet.  Muramoto was taken to Klang Hospital where he was pronounced dead, according to hospital director, Dr. Pichaya Nakwatchara. He was 43 years old and survived by his wife, Emiko, and two children.

The Thai military initially claimed to be shooting rubber bullets and tear gas, and only shooting live rounds into the air.  However, video footage showed soldiers firing assault rifles in fully automatic fire mode in the direction of protesters. Protest leaders claimed that a number of people were hit by army snipers from nearby buildings.  The military later admitted that troops fired live rounds directly at protesters, allegedly shooting only single rounds to protect injured troops retreating from the clashes.

Reactions
Reuters Editor-in-Chief David Schlesinger reacted in response to Muramoto's death, "I am dreadfully saddened to have lost our colleague Hiro Muramoto in the Bangkok clashes...Journalism can be a terribly dangerous profession as those who try to tell the world the story thrust themselves in the center of the action. The entire Reuters family will mourn this tragedy."

A Thai Army spokesperson claimed that protesters had attacked soldiers with grenades and petrol bombs before troops responded. The 2010 clashes, which led to calls for the resignation of Prime Minister Abhisit Vejjajiva's government, have been the worst political violence in Bangkok for 18 years.

See also 
 Kenji Nagai, photojournalist shot by a soldier in Rangoon, 2007
 Fabio Polenghi, an Italian freelance photographer, 2010
 Lucas Dolega, photojournalist shot by a policeman in Tunis, 2011
 Press Freedom Index

References

Further reading and resources

2010 deaths
Deaths by firearm in Thailand
Japanese photojournalists
Journalists killed while covering military conflicts
Reuters people
Temple University alumni
People shot dead by law enforcement officers
Year of birth uncertain
Protest-related deaths